UEMOA may refer to:

UEMOA Tournament - Annual International Football tournament
Union économique et monétaire ouest-africaine or West African Economic and Monetary Union